Hasards ou coïncidences is a French film directed by Claude Lelouch, released in 1998.

Starring
 Alessandra Martines : Myriam Lini
 Pierre Arditi : Pierre Turi
 Marc Hollogne : Marc Deschamps
 Véronique Moreau : Catherine Desvilles
 Patrick Labbé : Michel Bonhomme
 Laurent Hilaire : Laurent
 Geoffrey Holder : Gerry
 Charles Gérard : L'homme sur le bateau
 David La Haye : Le voleur

Awards
 Nominated for César Award for Best Music Written for a Film
 Best Actress at Chicago Film Festival for Alessandra Martines

References

External links
 

French drama films
1998 films
Films directed by Claude Lelouch
Films scored by Francis Lai
Films scored by Claude Bolling
1990s French films